Stade Maurice Boyau is a multi-use stadium in Dax, France.  It is currently used mostly for rugby union matches and is the home stadium of US Dax.

Opened in 1958, it is named for World War I fighter ace and pre-war French international rugby player Maurice Boyau.

The stadium is officially able to hold 7,262 people since the renovation held in 2019. It was previously officially able to hold 16,170 people.

References

External links
Photo of stadium

Maurice Boyau
Sports venues in Landes (department)
Sports venues completed in 1958
US Dax